Werner Hullen (17 October 1927 – 13 April 2008) was a German lexicographer.

Life 

He was born on 17 October 1927.

He died on 13 April 2008.

Career 

He received his PhD from the University of Cologne.

He then worked as a grammar school teacher.

He finally became an applied linguist at the universities of Trier and Essen.

Bibliography 

Some of his books are:

 English And American Poetry
 A History of Roget's Thesaurus: Origins, Development, and Design 
 Networks and Knowledge in Roget's Thesaurus 
 English Dictionaries 800-1700
 Understanding the Lexicon: Meaning, Sense and World Knowledge in Lexical Semantics 
 Understanding Bilingualism 
 Collected papers on the history of linguistics ideas

References

External links
 

1927 births
2008 deaths
German lexicographers
University of Cologne alumni
20th-century lexicographers